Pat Barrett (born 22 July 1967) is a British former professional boxer and now a boxing trainer and promoter. He held the British light welterweight title from 1989 and 1990, and was the European champion from 1990 to 1992. He went on to fight for the WBO Welterweight World title.

Early life
Pat Barrett was born on a council estate in North Manchester, England. Barrett walked into the Collyhurst and Moston Lads Club at the age of sixteen, following his brother Michael who was an amateur boxer.

Amateur boxing career
Nicknamed 'Black Flash', Barrett was trained by Brian Hughes. After joining the Collyhurst and Moston Lads Club, Barrett became an area champion as an amateur, in which he competed in twenty-six amateur fights - winning twenty-four.

Professional boxing career
Barrett made his professional debut at the age on May 1, 1987, with a win over Gary Barron. He won 13 of his first 15 fights, including a win over Dave McCabe, with a draw against Sugar Gibiliru, and the only defeat to Paul Burke.

In November 1988 he Kevin Plant on points in his home city to win the vacant BBBofC Central Area light welterweight title. He successfully defended this title against Gibiliru in April 1989, and Tony Willis four weeks later, and in October that year beat Robert Harkin on points at the Wolverhampton Civic Hall to take the British title. He relinquished the British title in 1990 to pursue higher honours. In August 1990 he challenged for Efrem Calamati's European title in Salerno, Italy, knocking the defending champion out in the fourth round to take the title. He made three successful defences of the European title, against Salvatore Nardino, Mark McCreath, and Racheed Lawal, stopping all three challengers. He relinquished the European title and moved up to welterweight. In July 1992 he challenged for Manning Galloway's WBO World welterweight title at the G-Mex Centre, losing a unanimous decision, after the fight had been postponed several times, a situation that led him to leave promoter Mickey Duff to join Frank Warren's stable. In September 1993 he faced Del Bryan for the vacant British welterweight title at the York Hall, Bethnal Green, Bryan taking the title on points. He moved up in weight again to light middleweight, and in November 1993 met Patrick Vungbo in Belgium for the vacant World Boxing Federation World title; Vungbo won on a split decision.

Legal problems led Barrett to leave the UK and travel to the United States to work with Lennox Lewis's former trainer John Davenport in the hope of securing a multi-fight contract and a second world title fight, and in March 1994 stopped journeyman Donnie Parker in four rounds. He returned to the UK, however, and shortly afterwards was arrested for failing to pay £6,000 of fines incurred for failing to produce his vehicle details after being repeatedly stopped by the police, and was declared bankrupt. He served three months in HM Prison Risley followed by 12 months probation. In December 1994, he beat Belgian champion Marino Monteyne in points in what proved to be his final fight, retiring the following year.

Later life and career as trainer and promoter
In February 2003, Barrett was arrested after being found with a loaded pistol in a hotel room in Chingford, with small quantities of heroin and cannabis also found. He denied all knowledge of the gun and drugs, claiming that he was set up (he was arrested as a result of an anonymous tip off), but was sentenced to two consecutive three-month terms in prison. Barrett later described the sentence as "the best thing to happen to me. I got caught and it opened my eyes." On leaving prison, Barrett attempted to obtain a trainer's licence, a process which took him five years. Barrett went on to run a security company and work as a trainer at the Moston and Collyhurst Gym, initially under Hughes, but later running the gym with Thomas McDonagh after Hughes retired, working with boxers such as Scott Quigg, Matty Hall, Matty Askin, and Barrett's nephew Zelfa. In 2011, Barrett was granted a promoter's licence, initially working with Wally Dixon, and in 2014 formed Black Flash Promotions. In May 2019, it was announced that Frank Warren's for Queensberry Promotions and Barrett's Black Flash Promotions would be entering into a partnership agreement with the aim of developing and showcasing the future young stars of British boxing.

Personal life
Barrett is the uncle of Commonwealth light-heavyweight champion Lyndon Arthur, and former Commonwealth super-featherweight champion Zelfa Barrett. On December 25, 2011, Barrett's nephew, John Lee Barrett, was attacked at a private party held at Sinclair's Bar in Rochdale, Greater Manchester, in which he later died from a single stab wound to the back.

Professional boxing record

References

External links

Black Flash Promotions

1967 births
Living people
English male boxers
Light-welterweight boxers
Welterweight boxers
Light-middleweight boxers
Boxers from Manchester